The Mixed Relay Biathlon World Championships was held in Pokljuka, Slovenia on March 12, 2006. As for the rules of biathlon in the year of the Winter Olympic Games World Championships being played only in disciplines not included in the Olympic program, therefore the championship consisted only of the mixed relay.

Mixed
 Date / Start Time: Sun March 12, 2006 / 11:00 CET

Medal table

References

External links

2006
World Championships
2006 in Slovenian sport
International sports competitions hosted by Slovenia
March 2006 sports events in Europe
Biathlon competitions in Slovenia